Road Wars is a British police reality television programme created by Raw Cut TV for British Sky Broadcasting and broadcast on Sky1 from 2003 to 2010. From Series 1 the show was narrated by actor Lee Boardman. The 2nd half of series 7 was narrated by actress Claire Goose.

As of 2023, the show has reruns  on Sky One, Sky Replay, Pick, Sky Witness and Sky Crime.

Format

Road Wars followed the work of police officers, documenting the changing tactics of criminals and the response of the UK police forces. For six seasons the show followed officers in the Thames Valley, but moved to Devon and Cornwall for the last series in 2009. The programme also features some police videos both in the UK and US.

Mancunian Lee Boardman narrated the show until the second half of series 7, employing a light-hearted and pun-intended approach. At the opening narration Boardman says "In Road Wars, the unexpected is always just around the corner".

The title music was composed by Nainita Desai and Malcolm Laws. Other music was made by the series' co-creator Bill Rudgard. In series 1 the title card consisted of 'ROAD WARS' in red dot-matrix form. A new title card was made for series 3, which was slightly edited with yellow accents for series 6. The first two seasons had six episodes, series 3 and 4 had eight episodes each, and series 5 and 6 had 20 episodes each.

For series 7 as the show moved to another police force, a new title card and new music was composed. Boardman left his position as narrator and the last 8 episodes were narrated by Claire Goose.

Thames Valley Police

For series 1–6, the programme followed the fourteen members of the Thames Valley Police's roads policing proactive unit (Road Crime Unit) – known as "Tango Victor". They are also said to be known to fellow officers as "Tango Vulture", taken from their callsign prefix TV (Tango Victor) and the joke that they swoop to steal arrests from other officers while they carried out their duties.

The footage from this team is combined with video footage from police forces around the world (though largely UK and US forces).

Officers

Officers involved in Road Wars are listed below. As a specialist unit, officers tended to appear in a couple of series, or just for one series.

Regular teams

Vehicles

The Thames Valley Police unit operates high-specification, unmarked 3.2L V6 Vauxhall Omegas (B2 model), replaced in later series by unmarked 2.8L Turbo V6 Police Special Vauxhall Vectras. The unit is tasked with taking a proactive role in fighting crime especially targeted towards street robbers and burglars, but also undertaking general traffic policing (the officers are drawn from normal Roads Policing teams).

Devon & Cornwall Police

In October 2008 the Thames Valley Police pulled out from the show after concerns on how its officers are depicted. From Series 7, the show moved on to follow the Road Crime Unit and the front line Dog Squad of Devon and Cornwall Police. The Road Crime Unit operates marked BMW 3 Series along with unmarked 2.5L Ford Focus STs.

Transmissions

There have been eight series of Road Wars. Four special episodes have been shown including two American episodes (known as Road Wars USA), which aired in 2005, where British police from the series travel to the U.S. to see the difference in police and criminal behaviour and two Christmas specials shown in 2003 and 2004. Three compilation editions entitled "Ultimate Road Wars", featuring action from the first six series, first aired on Sky1 on 11 November, 13 November and 1 December 2008.

Special
In a special two part series called Road Wars USA, Andy Samuels and Chris Piggott spent a couple of months attached to a Gang Unit in Cicero, Illinois, near Chicago, to note how law enforcement is practised in the United States.

International broadcasts
The Road Wars series has also been sold to these television networks and stations:

Notes:
  Broadcast under the name 'De Politie Op Je Hielen

See also
 Police Interceptors a show following police in Essex and South Yorkshire, and made by the same producers as Road Wars.
 Traffic Cops, (sometimes listed as Motorway Cops and Car Wars) a similar programme now shown on Channel 5.
 Brit Cops, similar police documentary on Sky Livingit.
 Police Stop!, a show from the 1990s showing footage from police car dashboard cameras, with occasional presenter links.
 Police Camera Action!, a similar programme on ITV.
 Street Crime UK, a similar programme shown on Bravo.

References

External links
 Official site on Sky (Archived 14 May 2007)
 

2000s British reality television series
2003 British television series debuts
2010 British television series endings
2010s British reality television series
2000s British crime television series
2010s British crime television series
Documentary television series about policing
Sky UK original programming
English-language television shows